Slaney is a surname.

Notable people with this surname include:
 Geoffrey Slaney (1922–2016), British surgeon and academic
 Ivor Slaney (1921–1998), England musical composer and conductor
 John Slaney (born 1972), Canadian ice hockey player
 Malcolm Slaney, American electrical engineer
 Richard Slaney (born 1956), British discus thrower
 Robert Aglionby Slaney (1791–1862), British barrister and politician
 Robert Slaney (ice hockey) (born 1988), Canadian ice hockey player
 Stephen Slaney (died 1608), English politician
 Thomas Slaney (1852–1935), English footballer and manager

 Mary Decker (married name Mary Slaney; born 1958), American middle-distance runner
 Philip Kenyon-Slaney (1896–1928), British politician
 William Kenyon-Slaney (1847–1908), English sportsman, soldier and politician